Breeland Clyde Speaks (born December 18, 1995) is an American football defensive end for the Michigan Panthers of the United States Football League (USFL). He was drafted by the Kansas City Chiefs in the second round of the 2018 NFL Draft. He played college football at Ole Miss.

Early years
Speaks attended Callaway High School in Jackson, Mississippi. During his senior season in 2013, Speaks had 118 tackles, 26.5 tackles for loss, nine sacks, 18 quarterback hurries, four forced fumbles, three blocked kicks, five pass breakups and an interception returned for a touchdown. A consensus 4-star recruit, Speaks committed to play college football for the Ole Miss Rebels in October 2013, choosing them over Mississippi State, Arkansas and Florida State among others.

College career
Speaks redshirted in the 2014 season. As a redshirt freshman in 2015, Speaks played in every game of the season, starting two. He totaled 32 tackles, 5.5 tackles for loss, one sack and one fumble recovery.

In 2016, as a redshirt sophomore, Speaks had 28 tackles (11 solo), 1.5 tackles for loss and one sack.

As a redshirt junior in 2017, Speaks totaled 67 tackles, eight tackles for loss and seven sacks. He was named to the AP All-SEC Second-team. After the season, he declared for the 2018 NFL Draft.

Professional career

Kansas City Chiefs
Speaks was selected by the Kansas City Chiefs in the second round (46th overall) of the 2018 NFL Draft. He played in all 16 games as a rookie with four starts, recording 24 tackles and 1.5 sacks.

On August 31, 2019, Speaks was placed on injured reserve. On December 6, 2019, while on IR, he was suspended four games for violating the NFL’s substance-abuse policy. He was reinstated from suspension on December 30, and placed back on the injured reserve list. Without Speaks, the Chiefs won Super Bowl LIV against the San Francisco 49ers.

Speaks was waived during final roster cuts on September 5, 2020.

Las Vegas Raiders
On October 2, 2020, Speaks was signed to the Las Vegas Raiders practice squad. He was released on November 3.

Dallas Cowboys
On November 17, 2020, Speaks was signed to the Dallas Cowboys practice squad. His practice squad contract with the team expired after the season on January 11, 2021.

New York Giants
On January 21, 2021, Speaks signed a reserve/futures contract with the New York Giants. He was waived on May 13, 2021.

Dallas Cowboys (second stint)
On September 1, 2021, Speaks was signed to the Dallas Cowboys practice squad. He was released on December 6, 2021.

Buffalo Bills
On December 22, 2021, Speaks was signed to the Buffalo Bills practice squad, but was released five days later.

Michigan Panthers
On December 22, 2022, Speaks signed with the Michigan Panthers of the United States Football League (USFL).

References

External links
Ole Miss Rebels bio
Kansas City Chiefs bio

1995 births
Living people
Players of American football from Jackson, Mississippi
American football defensive ends
American football outside linebackers
Ole Miss Rebels football players
Kansas City Chiefs players
Las Vegas Raiders players
Dallas Cowboys players
New York Giants players
Buffalo Bills players
Michigan Panthers (2022) players